Robert Neil Cavally (February 24, 1906 – April 25, 1994) was an American flutist who trained and inspired many noted flute performers and teachers, and edited many solos and etudes for use by teachers. He was an eloquent writer and woodworker.

Early life and education
Cavally was born in Cincinnati, Ohio and grew up in Denver, Colorado. He graduated from the Cincinnati Conservatory of Music where he studied with Ary van Leeuwen. He moved to France to do graduate work at The Paris Conservatory of Music with flutists Marcel Moyse and Philippe Gaubert. At the end of these studies he was offered a position with the Paris Opera Orchestra but turned it down because he would have had to give up his United States citizenship, and he returned to Cincinnati.

Career
He taught flute and conducted woodwind ensembles at Cincinnati College-Conservatory of Music from 1938 to 1979. He retired as Professor Emeritus of Flute. He was flutist with the Cincinnati Symphony Orchestra from 1943 to 1965. He taught flute at the Edgecliff College of Xavier University (Cincinnati) and had a studio in Dayton, Ohio.

Cavally's extensive performance career also included touring with soprano Lily Pons for 5 years, first flute with the Armco Band under the direction of Frank Simon, broadcasts on the NBC radio as soloist introducing compositions dedicated to him, Cincinnati Summer Opera and Dayton Symphony Orchestra. He played under the baton of many famous conductors: Georges Enesco, Eugene Goossens, Pierre Monteux, Paul Paray, Fritz Reiner, Max Rudolph, John Philip Sousa, Igor Stravinsky and Arturo Toscanini.

Awards and recognition
Cavally was recognized twice by the National Flute Association. On August 17, 1988 he was the Convention Honoree in San Diego. At the National Flute Association Convention in Orlando, Florida August 17–20, 1995, Bootsie Mayfield presented a retrospective of his life and co-authored, edited, published and distributed a written documentary entitled "The Cavally Legacy" which included contributions from many of his former students. Robert Cavally wrote and edited for the Flute Forum published by the W. T. Armstrong Company in the 1960s. He wrote "The Ideal Flute Tone" for the January/February edition of The Instrumentalist. He is listed in Music and Dance in the Central States and My Complete Story of the Flute  by Leonardo De Lorenzo.

Works
Works compiled and edited by Robert Cavally published through Southern Music Company, San Antonio TX:

Methods and studies
Famous Flute Studies and Duets
Let's Play the Flute
Melodious and Progressive Studies (Books 1-4) 
Andersen/Cavally - Op. 30 24 Instructive Studies
Andersen/Cavally - Op. 37 26 Small Caprices for Flute
Andersen/Cavally - Op 41 18 Studies
Andersen/Cavally - Op. 60 24 Virtuosity Studies
Andersen/Cavally - Op 63 24 etude Studies
Fuhler/Cavally - 24 Artistic Studies
Kohler/Cavally - Op. 33 Book 1 15 Easy Melodic Etudes
Kohler/Cavally - Op. 33 Book 2 12 Moderately Difficult Studies
Kohler/Cavally - Op. 33 Book 3 8 Difficult Studies  
Kohler/Cavally - Romantic Etudes
Kohler/Cavally - 22 Studies in Expression and Facility
Schade/Cavally - 12 Impromptu Etudes
Schade/Cavally - 24 Caprices

Collections
15 Concert Pieces
Romantic Music for Flute, Books 1 and 2
Van Leeuwen/Cavally - 7 Artistic Solos
Handel/Cavally - 7 Sonatas
Mozart/Cavally - Sonatas V-IX
Six Brilliant Pieces
Solos for the Debutante Flutist
24 Short Concert Pieces

Flute and piano arrangements
Andersen - Scherzino
Bach - Sonata in B Minor
Bach - Sonata in A Minor
Barth - Petite Suite Pittoresque
Benoit - Symphonic Poem
Bizet - Second Minuet (L'Arlesienne)
Blodek - Concerto
Delibes - Waltz of the Flowers
Duvernoy - Concerto
Gariboldi - Grand Fantasy on an Arabic Theme
Gluck - Minuet and Dance of the Blessed Spirits
Godard - Allegretto
Hofman - Concertstuck
Hue - Serenade
Jadassohn - Concert Piece
Kronke - Second Suite
Lax - Tarantelle
Manigold - Concerto
Perihou- Ballade
Pessard - Andalouse
Rimsky-Korsakov - Flight of the Bumblebee
Taffanel - Andante, Pastorale and Scherzettino
Verhey - Concerto

Ensembles
Andersen/Cavally - Allegro Militaire (2 flutes and piano)
Grimm/Cavally - Salute to Quantz (4 flutes)
Rebikoff/Cavally - The Musical Snuff Box (3 piccolos and 2 flutes)
Schumann/Cavally - Twelve Selections from "Album for the Young" (7-10 flutes)
Wagner/Cavally - Under the Double Eagle (3 flutes and alto flute)
Flute Family Sketch (piccolo, flute and alto flute)
Eight Madrigals for Seven Flutes

Sources 
The Flute Forum Autumn 1984 "Robert Cavally - Master Teacher" by Arthur Ephrass Director of Publications for Southern Music Company 
The Cavally Legacy August 1995 by Bootsie Mayfield (Flute Faculty at Gardner-Webb University North Carolina

References 

Musicians from Cincinnati
Musicians from Colorado
American flautists
1906 births
1994 deaths
20th-century American musicians
20th-century flautists